The Acronauplia ("Inner Castle") is the oldest part of the city of Nafplion in Greece. Until the thirteenth century, it was a town on its own. The arrival of the Venetians and the Franks transformed it into part of the town fortifications. Later, part of it was used as a prison until the Greek government decided that the view provided from its location would benefit the local tourism and built a hotel complex which still stands there today.

References 

Nafplion
Buildings and structures in Argolis